North Hulu Sungai Regency (Sungai means "River" in Indonesian) is one of the regencies in the Indonesian province of South Kalimantan. It has an area of 892.7 km2, and had a population of 209,246 at the 2010 Census and 226,727 at the 2020 Census; the official estimate as at mid 2021 was 228,830. The capital of the regency is the town of Amuntai.

Administrative districts
North Hulu Sungai Regency is divided into ten districts (kecamatan), listed below with their areas and their 2010 Census and 2020 Census populations. The table includes the locations of the district administrative centres, the number of administrative villages (rural desa and urban kelurahan) in each district, and its post code.

Climate
Amuntai has a tropical rainforest climate (Af) with moderate rainfall from July to September and heavy rainfall in the remaining months.

References

External links 

 

Regencies of South Kalimantan